Vladimír Penc (born 10 September 1893, date of death unknown) was a Czech long-distance runner. He competed for Bohemia in the 10,000 metres and the marathon at the 1912 Summer Olympics.

References

1893 births
Year of death missing
Athletes (track and field) at the 1912 Summer Olympics
Czech male long-distance runners
Czech male marathon runners
Olympic athletes of Bohemia
Athletes from Prague